Deh Shahverdi  or Deh-e Shahverdi may refer to:
 Deh Shahverdi-ye Sofla